Unit 7 is a 2012 Spanish crime drama action thriller directed by Alberto Rodríguez. It was written by Rafael Cobos and Alberto Rodríguez and stars Antonio de la Torre and Mario Casas. The film was nominated for 16 Goya Awards.

General description and themes 
This atmospheric piece is set in Seville, Andalusia in the four years leading up to the  1992 Universal Exposition of Seville. It dramatizes the social changes experienced by the city in a major "before" and "after" the World Expo, honing in on the process of cleaning up the city, eliminating the drug dealing from the streets in preparation for the World Expo, from the point of view of four (and particularly two) police officers comprising the (fictitious) Unit 7, renowned for their exaggeratedly elevated drug bust rate.

The film discusses the concept of the end justifying the means, focusing on themes of corruption, police violence, the psychology behind the figures carrying it out, and the politics (embodied by the police chief and unseen politicians) giving them carte blanche to do so, while washing their hands of the dirty deeds, condemning their actions when scandals break and condoning them when major drug busts are successful. It also describes life in some of the (formerly) more sordid neighborhoods or slums of Seville, as well as the sense of community displayed by some of their inhabitants when they decide to fight back against. All of this is portrayed with the backdrop of the ginormous construction work being undertaken to build the World Expo grounds on the outskirts of the city, shown as an enormous, bulldozed wasteland with no construction ever being seen in action but rather idle machinery and only marginally built bridges and buildings.

It shows the police officers as people, where it is not so clear where right ends and wrong begins, people who are being both exceedingly brutal, and yet sometimes expressing great tenderness or love, and it shows how the group of four feeds from one another in an escalation of violence in the name of eliminating the drug scourge. The director states that the movie could also be seen as "the rise and fall of a band of gangsters, only our gangsters are on this side of the law".

Plot
Unit 7 has a tough assignment: to clean the most dangerous drug trafficking networks out of the city and bring an end to the corrosive power that has taken hold of the streets. A detail of four, the unit is led by Ángel, a young officer aspiring to the rank of detective, and Rafael, a violent, arrogant, yet efficient cop.

But Unit 7's modus operandi is slipping outside the bounds of the law through their use of violence, coercion, lies and half-truths. For them, anything goes.

As they gain ground in their mission, the two officers head in opposite directions. Angel takes the path of ambition and police excess while Rafael will begin to change as a result of his feelings for beautiful, enigmatic Lucia.

Cast

Production 
The film was produced by Atípica Films, La Zanfoña and Sacromonte Films and it had the participation and support of Canal Sur Televisión, TVE, Canal+, AXN,  Audiovisual SGR, Junta de Andalucía, ICO and ICAA.

Release 
Distributed by Warner Bros. Pictures Intl. España, the film was theatrically released in Spain on 4 April 2012.

It also screened on 20 April 2012 at the Tribeca Film Festival (TFF) in New York.

Accolades

|-
| rowspan = "5" align = "center" | 2012 || rowspan=2|2012 Tribeca Film Festival ||Best Cinematography - Special Jury Mention ||Alex Catalán || 
|-
|Best Narrative Feature
|Alberto Rodríguez 
|
|-
|2012 Turia Awards
|Special Award
|Alberto Rodríguez 
|
|-
|rowspan=2|Neox Fan Awards 2012
|Best Spanish film
|
|
|-
|Best Spanish film actress
|Inma Cuesta
|
|-
| align = "center" rowspan = "34" | 2013 || rowspan = "2" | 18th Forqué Awards || colspan = "2" | Best Film ||  || rowspan = "2" | 
|-
| Best Actor || Antonio de la Torre || 
|-
| rowspan = "10" | 68th CEC Medals || colspan = "2" | Best Film ||  || rowspan = "10" | 
|-
| Best Director || Alberto Rodríguez || 
|-
| Best Actor || Antonio de la Torre || 
|-
| Best Supporting Actor || Julián Villagrán || 
|-
| Best Original Screenplay || Alberto Rodríguez, Rafael Cobos || 
|-
| Best Cinematography || Alex Catalán || 
|-
| Best Editing || José M. G. Moyano || 
|-
| Best Score || Julio de la Rosa || 
|-
| Best New Actor || Joaquín Núñez || 
|-
| Best New Actress || Estefanía de los Santos || 
|-
| rowspan=16| 27th Goya Awards || colspan = "2" | Best Film ||  || rowspan = "16" | 
|-
|Best Director
|Alberto Rodríguez
|
|-
|Best Original Screenplay
| Rafael Cobos and Alberto Rodríguez
|
|-
|Best Actor
|Antonio de la Torre
|
|-
|Best Supporting Actor
|Julián Villagrán
|
|-
|Best New Actor
|Joaquín Núñez
|
|-
|Best New Actress
|Estefanía de los Santos
|
|-
|Best Original Score
|Julio de la Rosa
|
|-
|Best Production Supervision
|Manuela Ocón
|
|-
|Best Cinematography
|Álex Catalán
|
|-
|Best Art Direction
|Pepe Domínguez del Olmo
|
|-
|Best Costume Design
|Fernando García
|
|-
|Best Makeup and Hairstyles
|Yolanda Piña
|
|-
|Best Editing
|José M. G. Moyano
|
|-
|Best Sound
|Daniel de Zayas Ramírez, Nacho Royo-Villanova, Pelayo Gutiérrez
|
|-
|Best Special Effects
|Juan Ventura
|
|-
| rowspan = "3" | 22nd Actors and Actresses Union Awards || Best Film Actor in a Leading Role || Antonio de la Torre ||  || rowspan = "3" | 
|-
| Best Film Actor in a Secondary Role || Julián Villagrán || 
|-
| Best Film Actor in a Minor Role || Alfonso Sánchez || 
|}

See also 
 List of Spanish films of 2012

References

External links
 
 Grupo 7 on La Higuera (in Spanish)
 "Especial Premios Goya. 'Fuimos una máquina contra la droga'" ("Goya Awards Special: 'We were a machine against drugs'"), interviews with Seville officers active during the time the film was set, Quino Petit, El País, 29 April 2012 (in Spanish). [Accessed 6 June 2017].

2012 films
2012 crime action films
Spanish crime action films
2010s Spanish-language films
Films set in the 1990s
Films directed by Alberto Rodríguez Librero
Historical action films
Films set in Seville
Atípica Films films
2010s Spanish films